"Don't Tell Me Goodnight" is a song by American singer-songwriter Lobo. It was released as a single in 1975 from his album A Cowboy Afraid of Horses.

The song peaked at No. 27 on the Billboard Hot 100, becoming his final top 40 hit until 1979's "Where Were You When I Was Falling in Love". It was a Top 5 hit on the Easy Listening chart, peaking at No. 2.

Chart performance

References

1975 songs
1975 singles
Lobo (musician) songs
Songs written by Lobo (musician)
Big Tree Records singles